Kinlichee Creek (also known as Ganado Wash and Kin(-)Li(-)Chee Creek) is a stream in the U.S. state of Arizona. It is located northeast of the census-designated place of Ganado in Apache County.

It flows to the southwest  and then west-northwest through Bear Canyon.

References

Rivers of Apache County, Arizona
Rivers of Arizona